Purnia Court railway station, (station code:- PRNC), is a railway station serving the city of Purnea in Bihar. This station is managed by the East Central Railway under the Samastipur railway division. Earlier it was a MG line which has now been converted to standard BG line and lies on the Purnea–Banmankhi–Saharsa section. The BG line was inaugurated by the Railway Minister of India Suresh Prabhu on 10 June 2016.

Platforms
This station has three platforms and one foot overbridge with ramp.

Trains
Time table of trains

Route of Kosi Express
 18626/18625 Kosi Express

References

Railway stations in Purnia district
Samastipur railway division
Purnia